Pseudosimnia adriatica, common name the Adriatic egg shell, is a species of sea snail, a marine gastropod mollusk in the family Ovulidae, the ovulids, cowry allies or false cowries.

Description
The size of the shell varies between 15 mm and 28 mm.

Distribution
This marine species occurs in the Western Mediterranean and in the adjacent Atlantic Ocean.

References

External links
 [Lorenz F. & Fehse D. (2009) The living Ovulidae. A manual of the families of allied cowries: Ovulidae, Pediculariidae and Eocypraeidae. Hackenheim: Conchbooks.

Ovulidae
Gastropods described in 1828